Domingo Cáceres (born 7 September 1959) is a Uruguayan footballer. He played in seven matches for the Uruguay national football team from 1979 to 1980. He was also part of Uruguay's squad for the 1979 Copa América tournament.

References

1959 births
Living people
Uruguayan footballers
Uruguay international footballers
Place of birth missing (living people)
Association football defenders